Leutnant Rudolf Friedrich Otto Windisch (27 January 1897 – after 27 May 1918) was a World War I fighter ace credited with 22 victories.

Early life and service
Rudolf Friedrich Otto Windisch was born in Dresden, Germany on 27 January 1897, the son of Bruno Windisch, who owned a pastry shop. During his childhood, Rudolf was very interested in aviation. He built model airplanes, and then a glider.

On 14 September 1914, at the age of 17, he volunteered for a year's service with Infantry Regiment 177. After a short period of training, he was off to war on the Western Front. On 21 November, he was wounded by shrapnel and removed from front line duty. He recuperated first at a hospital in Laon, France, then at the Reserve Military Hospital in his home town of Dresden.

On 22 January 1915, he was transferred to the Luftstreitkräfte. In February 1915, he was assigned to the Military Aviation School in Leipzig-Lindenthal. He was promoted to sergeant and was a flight instructor with FEA 6.

1 May 1916 brought a front line flying assignment with FA 62 on the Russian Front. On the night of 2/3 October 1916, he set out on what is arguably the first case of air-supported sabotage. He landed behind Russian lines and dropped off Oberleutnant Maximilian von Cossel (1893–1967) near the Rowno to Brody rail line. Cossel destroyed a railroad bridge that was of strategic importance to the Russians. Windisch swooped in on the 3rd to pick Cossel up and carry him back to safety. This feat earned him the Prussian Order of the Crown (4th Class with Swords); the Kaiser himself presented it on 18 October 1916. Windisch would be the only pilot so honored.

In November, he would transfer to Kampfgeschwader der Oberste Heeresleitung II to fly recon missions on the Western Front. On 20 February 1917, he moved up to flying fighters with Royal Bavarian Jasta 32.

Aerial combat career
Even before his feat of espionage derring-do, Windisch had scored his first aerial victory. On 25 August 1916, while still flying a two-seater reconnaissance airplane, he became a balloon buster by shooting down one of the Russian observation balloons southeast of Brody.

His next victory would be almost a year later, after he transferred to Jasta 32 on the French Front. On 18 September 1917, he shot down an AR2 near Fleury, France. That was the first of his five triumphs during 1917. The last of them, a Spad shot down near Laval, brought his count to six.

He shot down another balloon on 3 January 1918, and another Spad the following day. On 10 January, he was transferred to Royal Prussian Jasta 50 for seasoning before taking command of Royal Prussian Jasta 66 on the 24th.

Sometime during this period, Windisch wangled flying time in a captured Spad VII. It is unknown if he flew it in combat.

He scored his first win with his new squadron on 15 March 1918. He had six victories in that month, including a triple on 24 March 1918. He scored three more times in April, and five in May, to bring his tally to 22. No fewer than 16 of his wins were over Spad fighters. A Sopwith and an AR2 completed his list of fighter planes. He also destroyed three balloons and a single two-seater reconnaissance plane. The fact that he was one of the original pilots of Germany's best fighter, the Fokker D.VII, gave him tactical advantage over his foes.

Disappearance
His last victory was on the afternoon of 27 May 1918. Immediately after he shot down this last Spad, he was jumped by several other enemy scouts. A bullet through the gas tank forced him to land behind French lines, about 50 meters from his final victim.

The International Red Cross reported Windisch was a prisoner of war on several occasions. French pilots who fell into German hands reported him in a French prison. On the assumption he was alive, he was awarded the Pour le Merite on 6 June 1918. The reports differed on whether or not he had been injured, with some rumors saying he had died in captivity.

Nothing more would ever be heard of Windisch.

Windisch victories

See also
List of people who disappeared

Sources of information

References
 Above the Lines: The Aces and Fighter Units of the German Air Service, Naval Air Service and Flanders Marine Corps, 1914–1918. Norman Franks, Frank W. Bailey, Russell Guest. Grub Street, 1993. , .
 Spad VII Aces of World War I. Jon Guttman. Osprey Publishing, 2001. , .

1897 births
1910s missing person cases
1918 deaths
Aerial disappearances of military personnel in action
German military personnel killed in World War I
German World War I flying aces
Luftstreitkräfte personnel
Military personnel from Dresden
Missing in action of World War I
Missing person cases in France
People from the Kingdom of Saxony
Recipients of the Pour le Mérite (military class)